A non-drying oil is an oil which does not harden and remains liquid when it is exposed to air. This is as opposed to a drying oil, which hardens (through polymerization) completely, or a semi-drying oil, which partially hardens.  Oils with an iodine number of less than 115 are considered non-drying.

Uses 
Non-drying oil is often used as a base in anti-climb paint, a type of slippery coating used to prevent climbing on its surface. Another use would be in baby oil.

Examples

Almond oil
Babassu oil
Baobab oil
Castor oil
Cocoa butter
Coconut oil
Colza oil
Macadamia oil
Nahar seed oil
Mineral oil
Olive oil
Peanut oil
Tea seed oil
Tiger nut oil
Petroleum

References 

Oils
Crime prevention
Coatings
Visual arts materials
Painting materials
Wood finishing materials